Chaka is the debut solo album by singer Chaka Khan. It was released on October 12, 1978 through Warner Bros Record label.

Overview 

Two singles were released from Chaka, the first being her anthemic solo debut "I'm Every Woman", one of Khan's signature tunes alongside "Ain't Nobody" (1983) and "I Feel For You" (1984). The song has over the past three decades been re-released, remixed and covered a number of times, most notably by Whitney Houston in 1992 for the soundtrack album The Bodyguard, then featuring guest vocals by Khan herself and topping Billboard'''s Hot Dance Music/Club Play chart. A remix of Khan's original recording was also a Top Ten hit in the U.K. in 1989. The remix was included on the compilation Life is a Dance - The Remix Project, the title track of which was the second single release from the Chaka album in early 1979 (US R&B #40). The album also features the ballad "Roll Me Through The Rushes", never commercially released as a single but still receiving considerable airplay in 1979, as well as Khan's cover version of Stevie Wonder's "I Was Made To Love Her", re-titled "I Was Made to Love Him".

Following the release of the Chaka album Khan reunited with Rufus for the recording of 1979's Masterjam, produced by Quincy Jones. Her second solo album Naughty followed in 1980.

The Chaka album was re-released on CD in the United States by the Warner Music Group in 1998.

 Track listing 

 Personnel 
 Chaka Khan - lead vocals, backing vocals
 Steve Ferrone – drums
 Will Lee - bass guitar tracks 1, 3, 5
 Anthony Jackson - bass tracks 2, 4, 10
 Hamish Stuart - guitar tracks 1, 2, 4, 5, 6, 8, 10
 Phil Upchurch - guitar tracks 1, 2, 3, 4, 5, 7, 8, 9, 10
 Richard Tee - piano tracks 1, 2, 7, 8, electric piano track 4, clavinet track 5, piano & clavinet track 10
 Ken Bichel - synthesizer (S.R.M.) tracks 4, 6, 8
 George Young - alto saxophone tracks 2, 5, 6
 Ronnie Cuber - baritone saxophone tracks 2, 5, 6
 Michael Brecker - tenor saxophone tracks 2, 5, 6
 Barry Rogers - trombone tracks 2, 5, 6
 Randy Brecker - trumpet tracks 2, 5, 6, 8, 9, trumpet & flugelhorn track 7
 Brooks Tillotson - French horn tracks 3, 4, 7, 8, 9
 Jim Buffington - French horn tracks 3, 4
 John Clark - French horn track 7, 8, 9
Frederick Buldrini, Gene Bianco, George Marge, Guy Lumia, Harold Kohon, Jesse Levy, Joe Malin, Jonathan Abramowitz, Julien Barber, Kermit Moore, Marvin Morgenstern, Mitsue Takayama, Pat Winter, Regis Iandiorio, Richard Bock, Richard Sortomme, Susan Allen, Theodore Israel - strings
 Gene Orloff - concertmaster

Track 1 “I’m Every Woman”
Backing Vocals - Cissy Houston, Will Lee, Hamish Stuart

Track 2 “Love Has Fallen On Me”
Backing Vocals – Cissy Houston, David Lasley, Alan Gorrie

Track 3 “Roll Me Through the Rushes”
Drums – Rick Marotta
Guitar - Cornell Dupree
Electric Piano - Leon Pendarvis
Backing Vocals – Cissy Houston, David Lasley, Luther Vandross
Harp - Gene Bianco

Track 4 “Sleep on It”
Guitar – Andrew Kastner
Backing Vocals – Will Lee, Hamish Stuart

Track 5 “Life Is a Dance”
Backing Vocals – Alan Gorrie. Will Lee, Hamish Stuart

Track 6 “We Got the Love”
Lead Vocal - George Benson
Bass - Phil Upchurch
Electric Piano - Arthur Jenkins
Congas – Raphael Cruz
Flutes – Eddie Daniels, Phil Bodner
Alto Flute – George Marge

Track 7 “Some Love”
Bass – Mark Stevens
Guitar – Onnie McIntyre
Percussion - Airto Moreira
Tenor Saxophone solo - Michael Brecker
Trumpet & Flugelhorn - Randy Brecker
Alto Saxophone - David Sanborn

Track 8 “A Woman in a Man's World”
Guitar – Andrew Kastner
Bass Trombone - Paul Faulise
Percussion - Sammy Figueroa
Alto Saxophone - David Sanborn

Track 9 “The Message in the Middle of the Bottom”
Guitar – Onnie McIntyre
Bass - Hamish Stuart
Bass Trombone - Paul Faulise
Clavinet – Arthur Jenkins
Congas – Raphael Cruz
Tenor Saxophone solo - Michael Brecker
Cello – Jesse Levy, Kermit Moore, Richard Bock

Track 10 “I Was Made to Love Him”
Guitar Solo – Tony Maiden
Backing Vocals – Terri Gonzalez, Mark Stevens, Hamish Stuart

 Production 
 Arif Mardin - record producer, musical arranger brass, strings, woodwind
 Chaka Khan - musical arranger track 5
 James Douglass - sound engineer
 Bill Dooley - assistant sound engineer
 Michael O'Reilly - assistant sound engineer
 Randy Mason - assistant sound engineer
 Sheridan Eldridge - assistant sound engineer
 Anthony D'Amico - assistant sound engineer
 Lew Hahn - additional recording engineer, remix
 Gene Paul - additional recording engineer
 Recorded at Atlantic Recording Studios, New York
 Additional recording at Cherokee Recording Studios, Los Angeles

 References 

External linksChaka'' at Discogs

1978 debut albums
Chaka Khan albums
Albums produced by Arif Mardin
Warner Records albums